Pablo Cuevas was the defending champion. He lost his title in the semifinals to Benoît Paire. Paire went on to win the title, defeating Tommy Robredo in the final, 7–6(9–7), 6–3.

Seeds
The top four seeds receive a bye into the second round.

Draw

Finals

Top half

Bottom half

Qualifying

Seeds

Qualifiers

Qualifying draw

First qualifier

Second qualifier

Third qualifier

Fourth qualifier

External links
 Main draw
 Qualifying draw

2015 ATP World Tour
2015 Men's Singles